FXM may refer to:

 FX Movie Channel, an American television channel
 Force for Mexico (Spanish: Fuerza por México), a Mexican political party